Desertiguana is an extinct genus of lizard in the family Phrynosomatidae. It is a monotypic genus represented by the type species Desertiguana gobiensis from the Late Cretaceous Barun Goyot Formation of Mongolia. Desertiguana gobiensis is known from a single left lower jaw.

References

Phrynosomatidae
Cretaceous lizards
Late Cretaceous lepidosaurs of Asia
Fossils of Mongolia
Barun Goyot Formation
Fossil taxa described in 2013